The Prague Daily Monitor is an English-language electronic daily about the Czech Republic. It has been published since 2003.

It covers news from Europe, particularly Czech politics, business, society and culture from a variety of sources. It is available online and via email delivery.

References

External links
 Official website

2003 establishments in the Czech Republic
Publications established in 2003
Organizations based in Prague
Daily newspapers published in the Czech Republic
English-language newspapers published in the Czech Republic
Daily Monitor